James Harold Stock (born December 24, 1955) is an American economist, professor of economics, and vice provost for climate and sustainability at Harvard University. He is co-author of Introduction to Econometrics, a leading undergraduate textbook, and co-editor of the Brookings Papers on Economic Activity. Stock served as a Chair of the Harvard Economics Department from 2007 to 2009 and as a member of President Obama's Council of Economic Advisers from 2013 to 2014.

Academic career 
Stock graduated with a B.S. in physics in 1978 from Yale University. He then went to the University of California-Berkeley and completed his M.S. in Statistics in 1982 and Ph.D. in Economics in 1983.

Research 
His research areas include macroeconomic forecasting, monetary policy, and econometric methods for the analysis of economic time series data. His work includes an examination of the recent evolution of the US business cycle and the impact of changes in monetary policy on that evolution. He is a member of various professional boards, including the NBER's Business Cycle Dating Committee and the Academic Advisory Board of the Federal Reserve Bank of Boston.

Notes

Books 
Stock has published the following books:
 Introduction to Econometrics. Addison Wesley Longman (2003, 2007) (with Mark W. Watson).
 Introduction to Econometrics: Brief Edition. Addison Wesley Longman (2007) (with Mark W. Watson).

External links

Time series econometricians
Harvard University faculty
University of California, Berkeley alumni
Yale University alumni
Living people
1955 births
Fellows of the Econometric Society
20th-century American economists
21st-century American economists
Fellows of the American Academy of Arts and Sciences
United States Council of Economic Advisers
Brookings Institution people